Nassira Traoré (born 28 October 1988) is a Malian women's basketball player for US Colomiers. Traore competed for Mali at the 2008 Summer Olympics, where she did not score in 4 games. As part of the Malian national team, she participated in the 2017 Women's Basketball Africa Championship in Bamako. The national team finished 3rd, earning the bronze medal. Traoré was also part of the squad at the 2019 Women's Basketball Africa Championship in Dakar. The national team again finished in 3rd place, earning the bronze medal once again.

References

External links

1988 births
Living people
Malian women's basketball players
Olympic basketball players of Mali
Basketball players at the 2008 Summer Olympics
Sportspeople from Bamako
African Games gold medalists for Mali
African Games medalists in basketball
Competitors at the 2015 African Games
Forwards (basketball)
Malian expatriate basketball people in Portugal
Malian expatriate basketball people in Tunisia
21st-century Malian people